In New York is a 1991 live album by tenor saxophonist Steve Grossman with the McCoy Tyner Trio released on the Dreyfus label. It was recorded in September 1991 at Sweet Basil in New York City and features a live performance by Grossman and Tyner with bassist Avery Sharpe and drummer Art Taylor. The AllMusic review by Richard Ginell states "With this kind of firepower, the listener is usually guaranteed a satisfying level of cooking jazz, and that's certainly what we get here, though it seldom rises above that into a higher region".

Track listing 
 "Speak Low" (Nash, Weill)13:16  
 "My Ship" (Gershwin, Weill)9:45  
 "Softly, As in a Morning Sunrise" (Hammerstein, Romberg)12:10  
 "Impressions" (Coltrane)10:15  
 "Over the Rainbow" (Arlen, Harburg)9:29  
 "Love for Sal" (Grossman)8:58  
 "Good Bait" (Basie, Dameron)9:01  
Recorded at Sweet Basil, New York, New York on September 13 & 14, 1991

Personnel 
 Steve Grossmantenor saxophone
 McCoy Tynerpiano
 Avery Sharpebass
 Art Taylordrums

References 

1991 live albums
McCoy Tyner live albums